Elmendorf may refer to:

People with the surname
Dave Elmendorf, former NFL player
Douglas Elmendorf, 2009-2015 director of the Congressional Budget Office
Lucas Conrad Elmendorf, a United States Representative from New York
Steven Elmendorf, lobbyist

Places
Elmendorf, Texas
Elmendorf Air Force Base,  Anchorage, Alaska
Elmendorf Farm, Fayette County, Kentucky

See also
Elmendorf Christian Community, an independent Hutterite Colony in Mountain Lake, Minnesota
Elmendorf Reformed Church, listed on the National Register of Historic Places in New York City
Elmendorf Beast